Toxophorinae is a subfamily of bee flies in the family Bombyliidae. There are about 7 genera and more than 400 described species in Toxophorinae.

Genera
These seven genera belong to the subfamily Toxophorinae:
 Dolichomyia Wiedemann, 1830 i c g b
 Geron Meigen, 1820 i c g b
 Systropus Wiedemann, 1820 i c g b
 Toxophora Meigen, 1803 i g b
 Zaclava Hull, 1973 c g
 † Melanderella Cockerell, 1909 g
 † Paradolichomyia Nel & De Ploëg, 2004 g
Data sources: i = ITIS, c = Catalogue of Life, g = GBIF, b = Bugguide.net

References

Further reading

External links

 

Bombyliidae